"Go Tell Aunt Rhody" is an English language folk song of nineteenth-century American origin. It has a Roud Folk Song Index number of 3346. The tune is older, dating to the 18th century. It originated as a gavotte in the 1752 opera Le devin du village (The Village Soothsayer) by Jean-Jacques Rousseau.

The subject of the song is grief associated with loss, in this case from the death of an "old gray goose".

References 

American children's songs
19th-century songs
American folk songs
Traditional children's songs